The Cowboy Way is a 1994 American action comedy western film directed by Gregg Champion and starring Woody Harrelson and Kiefer Sutherland.

Plot
The Cowboy Way follows two championship rodeo stars and lifelong best friends, Pepper Lewis and Sonny Gilstrap as they travel from New Mexico to New York City in search of their missing friend, Nacho Salazar, who came to the city to pay for his daughter's trip to the U.S. from Cuba. When they discover that he's been murdered, the pair set out to find the killer.

Cast

In addition, Travis Tritt makes a cameo appearance.

Reception
On review aggregator Rotten Tomatoes, The Cowboy Way has an approval rating of 20% based on 15 reviews, with an average rating of 4.2/10.

Joe Brown of The Washington Post said, "The Cowboy Way is a weak rehashing of the Crocodile Dundee gimmick: two modern-day cowboys taming the Wild East. The tired formula may still have some life left in it, but not this 'Way'. This dud ranch is saddled with the charisma-free teaming of dumb guns Woody Harrelson and Kiefer Sutherland."

Year-end lists 
 5th worst – Robert Denerstein, Rocky Mountain News
 Top 10 worst (listed alphabetically, not ranked) – Mike Mayo, The Roanoke Times
 Dishonorable mention – Dan Craft, The Pantagraph

Box office
The Cowboy Way debuted at number 5 at the US box office and went on to gross $20 million in the United States and Canada and $25 million worldwide.

Soundtrack
 Good Guys Don't Always Wear White - Bon Jovi
 The Cowboy Way - Travis Tritt
 Mamas Don't Let Your Babies Grow Up to Be Cowboys - Gibson/Miller Band
 Blue Danube Blues - Cracker
 No One to Run With - The Allman Brothers Band
 On Broadway - Jeff Beck & Paul Rodgers
 Days Gone By - James House
 Candy Says - Blind Melon
 Too Far Gone - Emmylou Harris
 Sonny Rides Again - George Thorogood & The Destroyers
 Free Your Mind - En Vogue
 Suicide Blonde - INXS

References

External links

 
 
 
 
 

1994 films
1994 action comedy films
1990s buddy comedy films
American action comedy films
American buddy comedy films
American Western (genre) comedy films
1994 Western (genre) films
Country music films
Films set in New Mexico
Films set in New York City
Films scored by David Newman
Films produced by Brian Grazer
Universal Pictures films
Imagine Entertainment films
Rodeo in film
1994 comedy films
Films directed by Gregg Champion
1990s English-language films
1990s American films
1990s Western (genre) comedy films